Vance John "Vaejor" Rodriguez, previously known as "Mostly Harmless", Denim, and Ben Bilemy was an American hiker whose body was found on July 23, 2018 in Big Cypress National Preserve in Florida, then remained unidentified for two years. He was identified when a previous coworker recognized photos of him in December 2020, and his identity was released in January 2021.

Background 
The hiker started his journey on the Appalachian Trail in April 2017, from Harriman State Park near New York City. On the way, he met several people who took pictures of him. Witnesses reported that he preferred ketchup and sticky buns, and that he had said he came from Baton Rouge, was hiking to Key West, and had a sister living in Sarasota or Saratoga.

By January 2018, the hiker had reached northern Florida.

Discovery of body and investigation 
He was last observed alive after his arrival in the southwestern region of Florida in April 2018.

On July 23, 2018, the hiker was found dead in his tent by two hikers in Big Cypress National Preserve. He had no form of identification with him. The location was near Interstate 75.

The autopsy could not determine the specific cause of death, although he was described as being "emaciated." There were no signs of foul play. His DNA, dental information, and fingerprints did not match known missing person reports in any database. He wore a gray Columbia baseball hat and appeared to be between 35 and 50 years of age, with slightly graying brown hair and a beard. His backpack contained $3,500 in cash and a notebook filled with handwritten notes about Screeps, an online programming game.

Using information from witnesses' interviews, investigators developed a timeline of his activities. The Collier County Sheriff's Office also sought the aid of Othram Inc., a Texas-based company utilizing genetic genealogy to assist investigative agencies with resolving cases.

Identification
Rodriguez was identified in December 2020, over two years after his discovery. After viewing photographs of the then-unidentified man, a previous coworker contacted authorities, who obtained DNA samples from living relatives in Lafayette Parish, Louisiana. An official announcement from the Collier County Sheriff's Office was released on January 12, 2021. Othram had confirmed the match between Rodriguez and his family by performing the required testing. He was last known to reside in New York and worked in the field of information technology.

Rodriguez was arrested in Lafayette Parish for shoplifting in August 1994. It is not immediately clear if he had been fingerprinted after that arrest and, if so, why he was unable to be matched with those fingerprints during the two years that he remained unidentified.

Rodriguez's identification aired as a segment on CBS News Sunday Morning on February 21, 2021.

See also 
 Chris McCandless
 List of solved missing person cases

References

External links

1976 births
2010s missing person cases
2018 deaths
2018 in Florida
Accidental deaths in Florida
Big Cypress National Preserve
Collier County, Florida
Deaths by person in Florida
Deaths by starvation
Formerly missing people
Missing person cases in New York (state)
Hikers